Aliabad, Azerbaijan may refer to:
Aliabad, Bilasuvar, Azerbaijan
Aliabad, Jalilabad, Azerbaijan
Aliabad, Lerik (disambiguation)
Aliabad (38° 41' N 48° 33' E), Lerik, Azerbaijan
Aliabad (38° 50' N 48° 37' E), Lerik, Azerbaijan
Aliabad, Nakhchivan, Azerbaijan
Aliabad, Saatly, Azerbaijan
Aliabad, Zaqatala, Azerbaijan